Andreas Engelbert Rasmussen (15 March 1893 – 23 February 1967) was a Danish field hockey player who competed in the 1920 Summer Olympics. He was a member of the Danish field hockey team, which won the silver medal.

References

External links
 
profile

1893 births
1967 deaths
Danish male field hockey players
Olympic field hockey players of Denmark
Field hockey players at the 1920 Summer Olympics
Olympic silver medalists for Denmark
Olympic medalists in field hockey
Medalists at the 1920 Summer Olympics